The 2016 VLN Series was the 39th season of the VLN.

Calendar

Race Results
Results indicate overall winners only.

References

External links 
 
 

2016 in German motorsport
Nürburgring Endurance Series seasons